The George Westinghouse Jr. Birthplace and Boyhood Home is a historic home located at Central Bridge in Schoharie County, New York.  The property includes two 19th-century residences, two small barns, a well house and privy, as well as the site of a combined blacksmith shop and threshing machine works.  The house where inventor George Westinghouse was born, built circa 1825, is a -story, rectangular frame residence in a vernacular Greek Revival style.

It was listed on the National Register of Historic Places on March 20, 1986.

See also
 Westinghouse Memorial
 Westinghouse Park
 George Westinghouse Bridge

References

Houses on the National Register of Historic Places in New York (state)
Houses completed in 1825
Houses in Schoharie County, New York
Birthplaces of individual people
National Register of Historic Places in Schoharie County, New York
Blacksmith shops